Corey Perry (born May 16, 1985) is a Canadian professional ice hockey player for the Tampa Bay Lightning of the National Hockey League (NHL). He played the first 14 years of his career with the Anaheim Ducks. He then played for the Dallas Stars and Montreal Canadiens. During his two campaigns with Dallas and Montreal, Perry lost consecutive Stanley Cup Finals to the Tampa Bay Lightning, before joining them in that offseason, where he proceeded to lose a third straight Stanley Cup Final. Perry is known for his goal-scoring ability and an abrasive playing style with an ability to get under his opponent's skin; the former earned him the affectionate nickname "Scorey Perry", the latter the less affectionate "the Worm".

He captured a Memorial Cup with the Ontario Hockey League (OHL)'s London Knights and a gold medal with Canada at the World Junior Championships during his major junior career. Perry was drafted in the first round, 28th overall, by the Mighty Ducks of Anaheim in the 2003 NHL Entry Draft and won the Stanley Cup with the club in 2007. In 2008, he recorded 29 goals and 25 assists. He improved in 2009 to 72 points and was named to his first NHL All-Star Game. Perry continued his ascent in 2010 as he scored 27 goals and had 49 assists. In 2011, he won the Hart Memorial Trophy as the league's most valuable player for the 2010–11 season. He led the NHL with 50 goals and finished third in points behind Daniel Sedin and Martin St. Louis, with 98. He is the first player in NHL history to compete in the Stanley Cup Finals for a different team three years in a row and not win the Stanley Cup.

Internationally, Perry has won gold medals with Canada at the 2010 and 2014 Winter Olympics. He became a member of the Triple Gold Club after captaining Canada to gold at the 2016 IIHF World Championships, in addition to previously winning the Stanley Cup and the Olympic gold medal. Perry is only the second player (joining Scott Niedermayer) to combine Triple Gold membership with gold at the World Junior Championships, a Memorial Cup win, and a World Cup of Hockey win.

Early life
Perry was born on May 16, 1985, in New Liskeard, Ontario, the first of two boys born to Geoff and Nancy Perry. He and his brother Adam learned to skate when Corey was two. At age 10, he and his family moved from Haileybury, Ontario to Peterborough, Ontario. Growing up, his favourite NHL team was the Montreal Canadiens.

Playing career

Minor
Perry grew up playing hockey with the Peterborough Minor Petes AAA organization of the OMHA's Eastern AAA league. In 2001, Perry led his Petes to a victory in the inaugural OHL Cup Bantam AAA championship held in Peterborough. Perry had a stellar year offensively, scoring 73 goals in 67 games.

Junior
After a standout minor hockey career, Perry was drafted fifth overall into the Ontario Hockey League (OHL) by the London Knights in the 2001 Priority Draft. He immediately produced at a point-per-game pace for the Knights, recording 59 points in 60 games in his rookie season. The following year, his NHL draft year, Perry improved to 78 points and was selected 28th overall in the 2003 NHL Entry Draft by the Mighty Ducks of Anaheim. 

In the 2003–04 season, Perry scored 40 goals and 73 assists for 113 points in just 66 games, becoming the first Knight to reach 100 points in a season since Jason Allison did so in 1994. During the season, the Ducks were considering trading Perry to the Edmonton Oilers for Mike Comrie. The Oilers agreed to acquire Perry for Comrie, though there was one snag in the deal; Edmonton general manager Kevin Lowe felt that Comrie should return $2.5 million of his salary. Comrie ultimately refused to do so and the trade subsequently fell through. In the OHL playoffs, Perry scored seven more goals, with his offensive prowess earning him a call-up to the Ducks' American Hockey League (AHL) affiliate, the Cincinnati Mighty Ducks, for the remainder of the 2003–04 season. Perry was later named an OHL first-team All-Star after the season.

Entering his fourth and final year with the Knights in 2004–05, Perry scored a junior career-high 130 points in 60 games. He went on to post an additional 38 points in the post-season to capture the J. Ross Robertson Cup as OHL champions, en route to a Memorial Cup championship. In 18 post-season games, Perry scored 11 goals and handed out 27 assists. The Knights shut-out Sidney Crosby's Rimouski Océanic in the final.

Professional

Anaheim Ducks (2005–2019)
Perry made his debut with the Ducks the following season, in 2005–06. However, he was sent down to the AHL early in the year, along with fellow rookie and future linemate Ryan Getzlaf. Perry scored his first career goal against the Edmonton Oilers on October 10, managing to score a point in each of his first four career games. He recorded his first career multi-goal game against the Los Angeles Kings on January 28. Perry and Getzlaf combined for 67 points in 36 games with the Portland Pirates—the Ducks' new AHL affiliate—and were subsequently recalled by the Ducks ahead of the team's run in the 2006 Stanley Cup playoffs. In the playoffs, Perry scored no goals but managed three assists as the Ducks were eliminated in the Western Conference Final to Edmonton. Perry finished his rookie season with 25 points in 56 games with Anaheim.

In 2006–07, Perry improved to 44 points in a full 82 games, playing with Ryan Getzlaf and Dustin Penner on a combination dubbed the "Kid Line". He went on in the 2007 playoffs to win the Stanley Cup with Anaheim, scoring 15 points in 21 games. He assisted on a goal in Game 1 against the Ottawa Senators in the Finals while in Game 3, he scored a goal that helped the Ducks take the lead. After the Senators tied the score, Perry assisted on Getzlaf's goal as the Ducks took the lead again. However, the Senators scored the last three goals of the game and won 5–3. In the final game, Perry scored a goal and had an assist. Anaheim went on to win the next two games, securing its first-ever Stanley Cup.

The following year, in 2007–08, Perry increased his totals to 29 goals and 54 points and was named to his first NHL All-Star Game as an injury replacement (along with Scott Niedermayer) to join Chris Pronger and Ryan Getzlaf as four Ducks on the Western Conference squad. Perry also made Ducks history during the season—on January 4, in a game against the Chicago Blackhawks, he scored a goal just 16 seconds into the game, the second fastest goal ever scored by a Duck. Despite the personal successes of the year, Anaheim were unable to replicate the previous year's playoff success, falling to the Dallas Stars in the 2008 Conference Quarterfinals. Perry played in three games and had two goals and an assist. In the subsequent off-season, on July 1, 2008, Perry signed a five-year, $26.625 million contract extension, identical to a contract Ryan Getzlaf had agreed to the previous off-season.

The 2008–09 season was a break-out year for Perry. He led the Ducks with 32 goals and finished second on the team in points, with 72. On November 1, he recorded five points in a game against the Vancouver Canucks, four of which were assists, a career-high. However, on January 3, Perry was suspended for four games by the NHL after elbowing Philadelphia Flyers forward Claude Giroux during the third period of a game on January 2. Perry finished the regular season scoring four goals in the year's last five games. Continuing his scoring streak, he then contributed eight goals and six assists during the 2009 playoffs that saw the Ducks advance to Game 7 of the Western Conference Semifinals against the Detroit Red Wings, who ultimately ended the Ducks' season after their Game 7 victory. Perry scored the Ducks' second goal of that game. In Game 1, Perry scored a goal, but the Ducks lost 3–2, while the Ducks won Game 2 as Perry contributed two assists. After recording no points in a Ducks win in Game 3, Perry scored two goals and also recorded an assist in Game 4, but the Ducks lost 6–3. In Game 7, the Ducks lost the game, with Perry scoring a goal and providing an assist.

In the 2009–10, Perry posted a 19-game point streak that ultimately ended on December 4, 2009, against Dallas. He ended the year with a team-leading 76 points and 111 penalty minutes. He also finished second on the club with 27 goals—trailing only Bobby Ryan's 35—and second in assists, with 49, one short of Ryan Getzlaf's 50.

The following year, in 2010–11, Perry led the NHL with 50 goals, winning the Maurice "Rocket" Richard Trophy as a result, reaching the feat with a hat-trick against the San Jose Sharks on April 6, 2011. With 48 assists, he finished the season with 98 points, third-highest in the NHL. Perry was also chosen to the 2011 NHL All-Star Game, where he won the Shootout Elimination Challenge in the Skills Competition. Perry recorded his first career hat-trick in a game against the Minnesota Wild on December 12; he also recorded two assists in the game, giving him five points. His goals came at even strength, shorthanded and on the power play, making him the second player in Ducks history to score in all three situations, the other being Paul Kariya. After the All-Star Game, Perry exploded offensively—from February 2 to 18, he recorded at least one point in seven consecutive games, and recorded his second career hat-trick on February 5 against the Colorado Avalanche.

Nearing the end of the season, Perry continued his torrid scoring pace. On March 9, Perry scored two more goals, his 32nd and 33rd goal of the season, surpassing his previous career-high, single-season goal tally. Perry scored another goal in a win against Colorado. In the next game, he scored the only two goals as the Ducks lost to the Phoenix Coyotes. From March 19 through April 6, Perry recorded a least a point in ten consecutive games, later taking the NHL scoring lead from Steven Stamkos of the Tampa Bay Lightning when he scored two goals against the defending Stanley Cup champion Chicago Blackhawks. He then recorded his third career hat-trick in a game against the San Jose Sharks on April 6, with his third of the game giving him 50 for the year. After reaching the mark, he became just the third Ducks player to record a 50-goal season, joining Teemu Selänne and Paul Kariya.

Led by Perry's late-season scoring surge, the Ducks finished with 99 points, good for the fourth seed in the West, setting up a series with the Nashville Predators in the 2011 Western Conference Quarterfinals. After being held to no points in Game 1, Perry scored the Ducks' first goal on a power play in Game 2 against Pekka Rinne, later assisting on Ryan Getzlaf's goal that gave the Ducks a 3–1 lead. Near the end of the game, Perry then assisted on Bobby Ryan's empty-netter as the Ducks won 5–3. In Game 3, Perry recorded another two assists, but the Ducks fell 4–3. In Game 4, he set up Cam Fowler's power play goal early in the first period, and early in the third, Perry scored a short-handed goal to give Anaheim the lead in an eventual 6–3 victory. However, Perry recorded no points in the last two games, both of which the Ducks lost, eliminating them from the playoffs. Perry finished the series with two goals and six assists.

At the end of the 2010–11 season, Perry won the Hart Memorial Trophy, prevailing over finalists Daniel Sedin and Martin St. Louis, as the NHL's regular season MVP. He became the first Ducks player to win the Hart Trophy and the first Ducks player to win the Maurice "Rocket" Richard Trophy since Teemu Selänne in 1998–99.

For the 2011–12 season, Perry struggled early in the season, along with the rest of the team. The year was considered an off-year for Perry and his teammates. Despite the struggles, Perry was named to the 2012 NHL All-Star Game. Despite managing to score 37 goals to lead the Western Conference, the Ducks missed the 2012 playoffs after finishing fifth in the Pacific Division and 13th in the Western Conference.

In the lock-out-shortened 2012–13 season, Perry and his teammates got off to a much better start than the previous season, going 7–1–1 in their first nine games. Although his teammates were finding success scoring goals, Perry struggled to find the back of the net, scoring only one goal in his first 12 games. However, as the season progressed, Perry began to find his scoring touch, ultimately finishing the season with 15 goals and 36 points. In a game against the Minnesota Wild, Perry delivered a late hit to the head of Jason Zucker. After a review of the hit by NHL executive Rob Blake, Perry was given a four-game suspension.

On March 18, 2013, Perry signed an eight-year, $69 million contract extension with the Ducks, ten days after Ryan Getzlaf was signed to a similar eight-year contract. The 2013 playoffs would prove to be a disappointment for Perry, as he failed to score a single goal in the seven game loss to the Detroit Red Wings, despite firing 24 shots on goal.

Perry's 2013–14 season turned out to be one of his best as he had 43 goals and 82 points, helping the Ducks win their second consecutive Pacific Division title. Perry was selected to the first All-Star team for the second time in his career.

Perry was named to his fourth All-Star Game when he was named to the 2016 NHL All-Star Game, along with teammate John Gibson.

Perry's goal production declined during the 2016–17 and 2017–18 seasons, falling from 34 in 2015–16 to 19 and 17 respectively in the following seasons.

On September 26, 2018, Perry was ruled out for five months after undergoing surgery for a torn meniscus and MCL injury. He returned during the latter half of the 2018–19 season, contributing with 6 goals and 10 points in 31 games.

On June 19, 2019, Perry's 14-year tenure with the Ducks ended after he was bought-out from the remaining two years of his eight-year contract to become an unrestricted free agent. The buyout was prompted by his knee surgery and perceived declining utility, though longtime teammate Ryan Getzlaf would later remark that it had also served to free him from expectations, saying "when you have him as a $9 million player as opposed to a million and a half player, there's a lot different expectations. It allows a player to go and be just himself and not be judged on everything else, like his cap number."

Dallas Stars (2019–2020)
On July 1, 2019, Perry signed on the opening day of free agency to a bonus laden one-year, $1.5 million contract with the Dallas Stars. On November 13, 2019, he played his 1,000th career regular season NHL game against the Calgary Flames at the Scotiabank Saddledome. He became the 340th player in NHL History to hit the milestone. During the 2020 Bridgestone NHL Winter Classic on January 1, 2020, Perry was issued a game misconduct for elbowing Nashville defenseman Ryan Ellis at 2:40 of the first period. He was subsequently suspended for five games on January 3, 2020, and forfeited $40,322.60. Perry had 5 goals and 16 assists in 57 games before the regular season was prematurely ended by the onset of the COVID-19 pandemic. 

The Stars were on a six-game losing streak when the season ended, but when the NHL later scheduled the 2020 Stanley Cup playoffs to take place in late summer in a bubble environment in Edmonton, things proved to be different. Playing the Calgary Flames in the first round, Perry was credited with a pivotal role in the team's victory in Game 2 after losing the opening game, including an assist on Jamie Oleksiak's game-winning goal. He went on to contribute to the team's second round win over the Colorado Avalanche, and provided the screen for Denis Gurianov's Western Conference Final-clinching goal against the Vegas Golden Knights. The Stars reached the 2020 Stanley Cup Finals, playing against the Tampa Bay Lightning. Perry's most notable feat came in Game 5 of the series when he scored the overtime-winner to stave off elimination, though the Stars were ultimately defeated in six games.

Despite his strong postseason performance, the Stars opted not to re-sign Perry, a decision which would later be criticized.

Montreal Canadiens (2020–2021)
On December 28, 2020, Perry extended his career by signing as a free agent to a one-year, $750,000 contract with the Montreal Canadiens. Due to the ongoing pandemic, the NHL temporarily realigned all of its divisions and, to minimize travel, all teams played only within those divisions for the regular season. The Canadiens were part of the all-Canadian North Division. On January 11, 2021, Perry was waived by the Canadiens for the purpose of putting him on the team's taxi squad. Despite starting the season on the taxi squad, he would soon get opportunities for more regular play, starting with an injury to Joel Armia. On February 1, he scored his 800th career point with an assist on a Jeff Petry goal against the Vancouver Canucks. Perry had a strong showing during the regular season, finishing ninth in team scoring with 21 points. 

The Canadiens qualified for the fourth berth in the North Division in the 2021 Stanley Cup playoffs, entering a first round matchup with the Toronto Maple Leafs as decided underdogs. However, for the second year in a row, Perry's team would go on a surprise deep run in the postseason, ousting the Leafs in seven games before sweeping the Winnipeg Jets in the second round and then beating the Golden Knights in six games in the Conference Finals. In Game One against the Leafs, Perry attempted to jump over Leafs captain John Tavares who had earlier been knocked to the ice, however, Perry's knee clipped Tavares in the head. Tavares suffered a concussion and had to be stretchered off, and did not return for the rest of the series. After the game, Perry felt remorse for his role on the incident: "I don’t know what else to do there. I tried to jump. I know Johnny pretty well and just hope he’s OK." On reaching the 2021 Stanley Cup Finals, his second consecutive and third overall appearance, Perry reflected that "you come into this League at a young age, and you have success early. I went to the Conference Final my first year, and then we ended up winning my second year. You think it's going to happen over and over and over again. You just keep the same team together and just ride the wave, but that's not the case." Perry faced the Lightning in the Finals for the second consecutive year. The Canadiens were ultimately defeated in five games.

Following the end of the regular season, Perry expressed a desire to re-sign with the Canadiens. However, general manager Marc Bergevin declined to offer Perry a two-year contract, and he opted to sign elsewhere. This was later considered by many to be one of Bergevin's worst offseason decisions.

Tampa Bay Lightning (2021–present)
On July 29, 2021, Perry, having played in two consecutive Stanley Cup Finals losing efforts against the Tampa Bay Lightning, opted to join the back-to-back champions on a two-year, $2 million contract. On the occasion, he said "coming into a team that I've seen firsthand, the last two years. At the end of the day, where I'm at in my career, I want to win. I want to be a part of that and I'm looking forward to it." Shortly after the beginning of the 2021–22 season, he was named an alternate captain. After a 17-game scoring drought at the start of the season, he recorded his first goal with the Lightning on November 23, 2021 against the Philadelphia Flyers. He would go on to score 19 goals in the regular season, his most since 2016–17, and also 21 assists.

The Lightning qualified for the 2022 Stanley Cup playoffs, and for the second consecutive year Perry faced the Maple Leafs in the first round, again beating them in seven games. The Lightning then swept the Presidents' Trophy-winning Florida Panthers in the second round to reach the Eastern Conference Final. Perry had five goals in the first two rounds, tying Ross Colton for the team lead. His role on the team increased in the course of the playoffs, as injury to Brayden Point lead to him taking Point's place on the top power play unit. The Lightning went on to beat the New York Rangers in a six-game series, advancing to the 2022 Stanley Cup Finals. Perry became only the second player in the history of the NHL to go to the Finals in three consecutive years with three different teams, after Marián Hossa. After scoring a goal in Game 3, Perry became the first player in NHL history to score a goal in the Stanley Cup Finals with four different teams. Perry went on to lose his third consecutive Stanley Cup Finals with a third different team, becoming the first player in NHL history to do so.

International play 
 

Perry helped lead the Canadian junior team to a gold medal in the 2005 World Junior Championship, playing alongside Sidney Crosby and Patrice Bergeron on the team's first line.

On December 30, 2009, Perry was selected to play for Canada at the 2010 Winter Olympics in Vancouver. On April 16, 2010, Perry was among the first group of 15 players to be named to Canada for participation at the 2010 IIHF World Championships in Cologne, Mannheim and Gelsenkirchen, Germany.

In Canada's first game of the 2010 Winter Olympics, Perry helped lead the team to an 8–0 victory over Norway, scoring one goal. In the tournament quarterfinals against Russia, he scored another two goals in a 7–3 win, then scored the second goal in the gold medal game against the United States to make the score 2–0 in the second period. Canada went on to win the game 3–2 after an overtime goal by Sidney Crosby, thus winning gold.

Perry contributed one assist in Canada's six games en route to a gold medal victory at the 2014 Winter Olympics over Sweden in Sochi.

At the 2016 IIHF World Championship, Perry served as captain en route to a gold medal finish.

Personal life
Perry's younger brother Adam played alongside him on the London Knights' 2005 Memorial Cup-winning team. Adam was the assistant coach of the London Nationals Junior B Team, although he is currently in law enforcement, like their father. Perry currently lives in London, Ontario, during the off-season. He married long time girlfriend Blakeny Robertson on July 18, 2015, and they have a son.

Career statistics

Regular season and playoffs
Bold indicates led league

International

Awards and honours

References

External links 

 

1985 births
Living people
Anaheim Ducks draft picks
Anaheim Ducks players
Canadian ice hockey right wingers
Cincinnati Mighty Ducks players
Dallas Stars players
Hart Memorial Trophy winners
Ice hockey people from Ontario
Ice hockey players at the 2010 Winter Olympics
Ice hockey players at the 2014 Winter Olympics
London Knights players
Medalists at the 2010 Winter Olympics
Medalists at the 2014 Winter Olympics
Mighty Ducks of Anaheim players
Montreal Canadiens players
National Hockey League All-Stars
National Hockey League first-round draft picks
Olympic gold medalists for Canada
Olympic ice hockey players of Canada
Olympic medalists in ice hockey
Portland Pirates players
Rocket Richard Trophy winners
Sportspeople from Peterborough, Ontario
Stanley Cup champions
Tampa Bay Lightning players
Triple Gold Club
Canadian expatriate ice hockey players in the United States